Giovanni Pozzo (fl. 1620s) was an Italian composer. A solo motet, Veni sancte spiritus was included in Ghirlanda sacra, 1625.

17th-century Italian composers
Italian male composers
17th-century male musicians